"Silver Dream Machine" is a song by David Essex released in March 1980 as a single from the film Silver Dream Racer in which Essex also starred. Despite the film's commercial failure, the song reached number 4 on the UK Singles Charts, making it Essex's sixth top 5 hit.

Charts

References 

1980 singles
David Essex songs